The Taliban Shuffle: Strange Days in Afghanistan and Pakistan is a memoir by U.S. journalist Kim Barker about her experiences reporting in Pakistan and Afghanistan. It  was published in 2011.

Reception
BookBrowse rated the book 4/5.

Film adaptation

In February 2014, U.S. actress Tina Fey confirmed that her production company, Little Stranger, would be adapting the book into a film, which was released in March 2016. Fey stars in the film, which was produced by Lorne Michaels and written by Robert Carlock. Paramount hired Glenn Ficarra and John Requa to direct the film. It co-stars Margot Robbie, Martin Freeman, Billy Bob Thornton, and Alfred Molina.

References

2011 non-fiction books
Books about Afghanistan
Books about journalism
Books about Pakistan
Memoirs adapted into films
Doubleday (publisher) books
American memoirs